Olga Mykolayivna Savchuk (born 20 September 1987) is a retired tennis player from Ukraine. Savchuk grew up in the city of Makiyivka in Donetsk province. She resides in Nassau, Bahamas.

Her best accomplishment to date was reaching the third round of the 2006 Australian Open. Her career-high singles ranking is world No. 79, which she achieved on 19 May 2008.

Since the beginning of 2020, Savchuk is one of the two coaches of top-ten player Karolína Plíšková, along with Daniel Vallverdú and since November 2020 along with Sascha Bajin.

Career
On 5 August 2007, in Washington, D.C., Savchuk reached the Legg Mason USTA Women's Pro Circuit final as the No. 2 seed, but was defeated by Melinda Czink of Hungary in two sets.

Savchuk won three doubles titles on the WTA Tour, 2008 the Tashkent Open, and 2017 the Hobart International both with Raluca Olaru, and the 2014 Katowice Open won with Yuliya Beygelzimer. She won one WTA 125K series doubles titles, at the Ningbo International Open where she won with Arina Rodionova in 2014.

She was also runner-up in doubles finals in 2010 at the Copa Colsanitas with Anastasiya Yakimova, and in 2015 at the Malaysian Open with Yuliya Beygelzimer, the Swedish Open with Tatjana Maria, and the Baku Cup with Vitalia Diatchenko. On 23 October 2017, she peaked at No. 33 in the WTA doubles rankings.

She was the winner of three singles and seven doubles titles on the ITF Circuit.

Playing for Ukraine Fed Cup team, Savchuk has a win–loss record of 21–8 in Fed Cup competition.

WTA career finals

Doubles: 9 (3 titles, 6 runner-ups)

WTA 125 tournament finals

Doubles: 1 title

ITF Circuit finals

Singles: 10 (3–7)

Doubles: 19 (7–12)

Performance timelines

Singles

Doubles

References
 Translated from the French Wikipedia page, accessed on June 27, 2006

External links

 
 
 
 
 
 
 

1987 births
Living people
Sportspeople from Makiivka
Ukrainian female tennis players
Tennis players at the 2016 Summer Olympics
Olympic tennis players of Ukraine
21st-century Ukrainian women